The Understanding is the second studio album by Norwegian electronic music duo Röyksopp. It was released on 22 June 2005 by Wall of Sound. The Understanding debuted at number 13 on the UK Albums Chart, with 22,466 copies sold in its first week. The album was certified gold by the British Phonographic Industry (BPI) on 1 December 2006, and had sold 103,500 copies in the United Kingdom by March 2009.

In popular culture
Similarly to Melody A.M., songs from The Understanding were used widely in television adverts and video games. "Circuit Breaker" and "Only This Moment" were used in an episode of Danmarks Radio's consumer programme, named Rabatten. "Follow My Ruin" was also included on the soundtrack to FIFA 06. "What Else Is There?" was used in an O2 television advertisement in the Czech Republic in 2007 and in Slovakia in 2008. It was also used in the films Cashback (2006) and Meet Bill (2007). A remixed version of "What Else Is There?" was featured on the 15 April 2007 episode of the HBO series Entourage.

Track listing

Sample credits
 "What Else Is There?" contains a sample from "Love Me, Love the Life I Lead" by The Drifters and "Kill Me with Your Love" by Jericho.
 "Dead to the World" contains a sample from "Who We Are" by Camel.

Personnel
Credits adapted from the liner notes of The Understanding.

 Röyksopp – performance, arrangement, mixing, production
 Chelonis R. Jones – vocals 
 Karin Dreijer – vocals 
 Olof Dreijer – vocal recording 
 Kate Havnevik – additional vocals, creative input 
 Tom Elmhirst – co-mixing 
 Kato Ådland – bass on "Triumphant"
 Ib Kleiser – guitar 
 Sanghon Kim – artwork
 Camille Vivier – photos

Charts

Certifications

|}

Release history

References

2005 albums
Astralwerks albums
Röyksopp albums
Wall of Sound (record label) albums